Longxi Station, formerly Huaboyuan Station during planning, is a metro station on  Guangfo Line. It is located under Longxi Avenue in the Liwan District of Guangzhou, near the Guangzhou Luxin Garden. It started operation on 3November 2010.

Station layout

Exits

References

Foshan Metro stations
Railway stations in China opened in 2010
Guangzhou Metro stations in Liwan District